A Different Image is a 1982 film directed, written, and edited by Alile Sharon Larkin that explores body image and societal beauty standards through the eyes of a young Black woman on a journey towards self-worth.

Summary
Alana (Margot Saxton-Federlla), an art student, explores sexuality, Western ideals of beauty, and her own self-worth in 1980's Los Angeles. Vincent (Adisa Anderson), her long-time friend, feels pressure to turn their platonic relationship into a sexual one which further sparks Alana's frustration with western, patriarchal beauty standards and gender norms.

Cast
Margòt Saxton-Federella as Alana
Michael Adisa Anderson as Vincent

Production
Creating a Different Image: Portrait of Alile Sharon Larkin is a 1989 documentary about the making of A Different Image

Reception
The film is considered as a groundbreaking foray into a realistic character portrait of a young Black woman. Kevin Thomas of the Los Angeles Times heralded it as "...extraordinary, a fresh and clear expression of an acute sensibility."

Awards and recognition
 First Prize, Black American Cinema Society Award
 Official Selection, London Black Film Festival
 Best Production of 1981, Black Filmmaker Foundation
 Runner Up, Best Short Film, Filmex
 Official Selection, the 2011 L. A. Rebellion:  Creating New Cinema

Screenings
 UCLA's L.A. Rebellion Film Series, UCLA Hammer Museum, 2011
 Madeline Anderson Shorts, Brooklyn Academy of Music, 2013
 Afterimage: Madeline Anderson, Berkeley Art Museum, 2016
 One Way or Another: Black Women's Cinema, 1970–1991, Brooklyn Academy of Music, 2017

Preservation
The Black Film Center/Archive preserved A Different Image, which included 16mm original color reversal A/B rolls and full-coat magnetic track elements. They produced a 16mm color internegative, a soundtrack negative, and two new 16mm projection prints.

The script of the film was published in a 1991 compilation of collected works called Screenplays of the African American Experience.

See also
L.A. Rebellion
Black Women Filmmakers

References

External links
 

African-American drama films
1982 films
American independent films
1980s English-language films
1980s American films